The October 1974 United Kingdom general election in Northern Ireland was held on 10 October with 12 MPs elected in single-seat constituencies using first-past-the-post as part of the wider general election in the United Kingdom.

Results
This was the second general election to take place in 1974, as Harold Wilson who was leading a minority government sought to secure a majority for the Labour Party. He was successful, but only by a very narrow margin, which dissipated over the course of the parliament.

In Northern Ireland, the United Ulster Unionist Council continued to support an arrangement between the Ulster Unionist Party, the Vanguard Unionist Progressive Party and the Democratic Unionist Party not to contest against each other in their joint opposition to the Sunningdale Agreement, while former Prime Minister of Northern Ireland Brian Faulkner led the new Unionist Party of Northern Ireland in favour of a coalition-based executive under the Agreement. Enoch Powell, formerly an MP for Wolverhampton South West from 1959 to February 1974, was elected for Down South. Powell had left the Conservative Party in opposition to the accession of the United Kingdom to the European Communities.

On the nationalist side, the SDLP held its seat in Belfast West, and stood aside in Fermanagh and South Tyrone, allowing for the defeat of UUP leader Harry West by Independent Nationalist Frank Maguire.

MPs elected

References

 

Northern Ireland
General elections in Northern Ireland to the Parliament of the United Kingdom
1974 elections in Northern Ireland